The Golden Globe Award for Best Actor – Miniseries or Television Film or Best Actor – Miniseries or Motion Picture Made for Television is a Golden Globe Award presented annually by the Hollywood Foreign Press Association (HFPA). It is given in honor of an actor who has delivered an outstanding performance in a leading role on a miniseries or motion picture made for television for the calendar year. The award was first presented at the 39th Golden Globe Awards on January 30, 1982, to Mickey Rooney for his role on Bill. Performances by an actor in a miniseries or television film were originally awarded in the Best Actor – Television Series Drama category before the creation of this category.

Since its inception, the award has been given to 34 actors. Michael Keaton is the current recipient of the award for his performance in Dopesick. Robert Duvall, James Garner, and Al Pacino have won the most awards in this category with two each. James Woods has been nominated for the award on seven occasions, the most within the category.

Winners and nominees
Listed below are the winners of the award for each year, as well as the other nominees.

1980s

1990s

2000s

2010s

2020s

Superlatives

Multiple wins

Multiple nominations

See also
 Critics' Choice Television Award for Best Actor in a Movie/Miniseries
 Primetime Emmy Award for Outstanding Lead Actor in a Limited Series or Movie
 Screen Actors Guild Award for Outstanding Performance by a Male Actor in a Miniseries or Television Movie

References

Golden Globe Awards
 
Television awards for Best Actor